Thor 5, also known as Thor 2R is a Norwegian communications satellite. It was successfully launched for Telenor atop an International Launch Services Proton-M/Briz-M carrier rocket, at 11:34 GMT on 11 February 2008. It is based on the STAR-2 satellite bus, and was constructed by Orbital Sciences Corporation. It carries 24 Ku band transponders, to provide direct-to-home television broadcasting. After launch, the Briz-M upper stage placed Thor 5 directly into a geosynchronous orbit, eliminating the need for orbital raising manoeuvres and making the spacecraft able to save weight by carrying less fuel. It is positioned at a longitude of 1° West.

References

Communications satellites in geostationary orbit
Spacecraft launched in 2008
Telenor
Satellites of Norway
Satellites using the GEOStar bus